MOA-2008-BLG-310L is a 23rd magnitude star located at least 20000 light years away in the constellation Scorpius. This star has mass 0.67 solar masses which imply that it could probably be a late K-type star. In 2009 during the microlensing event, a planet was found orbiting this star at a distance of 1.25 AU and has mass 0.23 times that of Jupiter.

See also 
 MOA-2007-BLG-192L
 OGLE-2005-BLG-390L
 List of extrasolar planets

References 
 
 

G-type main-sequence stars
Scorpius (constellation)
Planetary systems with one confirmed planet
Gravitational lensing